Voznesenovka is a rural locality (a settlement) in Novochigolskoye Rural Settlement, Talovsky District, Voronezh Oblast, Russia. The population was 183 as of 2010. There are 4 streets.

Geography 
Voznesenovka is located 14 km west of Talovaya (the district's administrative centre) by road. Pokrovsky is the nearest rural locality.

References 

Rural localities in Talovsky District